Tannay may refer to: 

 Tannay, Switzerland, a municipality in the canton of Vaud, Switzerland
 Tannay, Ardennes, a commune in the Ardennes department, France
 Tannay, Nièvre, a commune in the Nièvre department, France

See also
Tanay (disambiguation)